London Westside B.C. are an English basketball club, based in the North Kensington area of West London, England.

History
The club was founded in 2000, with strong links to the local community and to provide opportunity for talented local players to develop.

Westside had much early success in the regional leagues, and entered the English Basketball League for the first time in 2004.

The club was severely disrupted by the Grenfell Tower fire in 2017, with their main home venue out of action for a considerable period as a hub for the relief effort. The club were later awarded funds from the Grenfell Young People's Fund, raised by readers who donated to the London Evening Standard's Dispossessed Fund Grenfell Appeal, to support their youth development work.

Honours
Men's National League Division 3 South League Champions: 2010-11 
Men's National League Division 3 Playoffs Champions: 2010-11
Men's National Founders Cup: 2002-03

Academy
The club is partnered with St Charles College, who compete in the Academies Basketball League. The ABL is the second-tier under 19's competition in the United Kingdom. St Charles were runners-up in the competition in 2019.

Teams
For the 2019–20 season, Westside will field the following teams:

Senior Men - National League Division 2 South
U18 Men - National League U18 Premier South

U16 Boys - National League U16 Premier South
U16 Girls - National League U16 Premier South 

U14 Boys - National League U14 Premier South East

Home Venue
Westside are based at Kensington Leisure Centre and St Paul's School, London.

Season-by-season records

References

Basketball teams in England
Sport in London
Basketball teams established in 2000
2000 establishments in England